Somewhere Near Paterson is a 2000 album by singer-songwriter Richard Shindell.  It was Shindell's first album for Signature Sounds.  It was also Shindell's first album following the album and tour performed with the collaboration, Cry Cry Cry.  His band mates Lucy Kaplansky and Dar Williams join with him here on Buddy and Julie Miller's "My Love Will Follow You".

Track listing
All songs by Richard Shindell except where noted
 "Confession" – 5:18 
 "Abuelita" – 3:55 
 "You Stay Here" – 3:59 
 "My Love Will Follow You" (Buddy Miller, Julie Miller) – 4:13 
 "Spring" – 5:07 
 "Wisteria" – 4:50 
 "Waiting for the Storm" – 3:33 
 "The Grocer's Broom" – 4:04 
 "Merritt Parkway, 2am" – 3:28 
 "Transit" – 5:56 
 "Calling the Moon" (Dar Williams) – 4:59

Personnel

Musicians:
 Richard Shindell – vocals, acoustic guitar
 Larry Campbell – cittern, appalachian dulcimer, dobro, pedal steel, acoustic, electric and baritone guitar, mandolin, violin
 Siobhan Egan – bodhran
 Lucy Kaplansky – harmony vocals
 Denny McDermott – drums, percussion
 Joanie Madden – tin whistle
 Billy Masters – electric guitar
 Roy Matthews - engineer
 Lincoln Schleiffer – bass
 Rick Slater - engineer
 Kenny White – piano
 Dar Williams – harmony vocals

Production
 Produced by Larry Campbell
 Mixed by Ben Wisch
 Recorded at The Loft Recording Studios, Bronxville, NY.
 Mastered by David Glasser at Airshow.
 Photography by C. Taylor Crothers.
 Design by Hunter Studio

References

External links
 Somewrere page at richardshindell.com

2000 albums
Richard Shindell albums
Albums produced by Larry Campbell (musician)